Moortown St Malachy's is a GAA club based in the village of Moortown in County Tyrone, Northern Ireland.

History
Moortown are one of the most successful clubs in Tyrone having won four Tyrone Senior Football Championships in 1941, 1942, 1950 and 1992.

Moortown St Malachys will celebrate their centenary year in 2023. 

Their last county championship victory came in 1992 and the side was captained by James Devlin. However, the Malachys have a less than inspiring record in finals and on innumerable occasions have reached junior, intermediate and senior finals and then fallen at the final hurdle.

The club used to field a hurling team in the 1970s, competing in the Derry league.

Their pitch for many years, Tobin Park, has now reached the end of its use and the club has moved to their new pitch on the Aneeter road. There are 3 pitches, a warm up area and just recently, a new community hall has been developed. The Club intend to start work on Changing rooms and Gym in 2023. 

Within only 4 years of formation, the Ladies senior team have been promoted to the top tier for 2023 and for the first time in the clubs history, they will have both Senior Ladies and Mens teams compete in Division 1.

Honours
 Tyrone Senior Football Championship (4)
 1941, 1942, 1950, 1992
 Tyrone Intermediate Football Championship 
 1975, 2021
 Tyrone Junior Football Championship (5)
 1934, 1948, 1950, 1952, 1969

Ladies Honours
 Tyrone Ladies Intermediate Championship
 2022
 Tyrone Ladies Junior Championship
 2021

References

Gaelic games clubs in County Tyrone
Gaelic football clubs in County Tyrone